The National 49er Pairs national bridge championship was held at the spring American Contract Bridge League (ACBL) North American Bridge Championship (NABC).

The 49er Pairs was a matchpoint pairs event. The event typically started on the Wednesday of the NABC. It was restricted to those with fewer than 50 masterpoints.

History
The National 49er Pairs was a one-day matchpoint event in which players competed for the Fifth Chair Trophy.

The first National 49er Pairs was held in 1997. Winners' names were added to the Fifth Chair Trophy. The Fifth Chair Foundation is an international non-profit organization dedicated to promoting bridge on the Internet and attracting new players to the game.

Winners

Sources
 List of previous winners, Page 6.  
 2007 winners, Page 1.

External links
ACBL official website

North American Bridge Championships